The 1990–91 Eastern Counties Football League season was the 49th in the history of Eastern Counties Football League a football competition in England.

Premier Division

The Premier Division featured 20 clubs which competed in the division last season, along with one new club, promoted from Division One:
Cornard United

League table

Division One

Division One featured 16 clubs which competed in the division last season, along with three new clubs:
Brightlingsea United, transferred from the Essex Senior League
Sudbury Town reserves
Swaffham Town, joined from the Anglian Combination

Also, Coalite Yaxley changed name to Clarksteel Yaxley.

League table

References

External links
 Eastern Counties Football League

1990-91
1990–91 in English football leagues